Golem is a single-player adventure developed by Longbow Games about a young girl and a shape-shifting golem who must navigate the ruins of an ancient tower to solve its ever more challenging puzzles and re-activate its long-dormant machines. It was released 29 May 2018.

Gameplay
In Golem, the player is tasked to explore 10 levels that unfold within an ancient mysterious tower. By using several abilities given by five forms, the golem can solve various puzzles found there.

Reception
Golem met a positive reception with 75% Metacritic score based on 6 reviews. Adventure Gamers gave a 4.5/5 stars rating and said, "Golem is fun little puzzle-platformer with a top-notch presentation both in sound and art direction." However, when the game was released, there were a few issues with the game controls.

References

External links
 Official Website
 Golem at MobyGames

2018 video games
Adventure games
Fictional golems
Longbow Games games
Puzzle video games
Side-scrolling video games
Single-player video games
Video games about shapeshifting
Video games developed in Canada
Video games featuring female protagonists
Windows games
Windows-only games